Paulownia kawakamii, commonly known as the sapphire dragon tree, is a tree species in the family Paulowniaceae.

The tree is native to Taiwan, eastern China, and Japan.  It is deciduous and bears many large violet flowers in early spring before the leaves appear.

Paulownia kawakamii is an IUCN Red List critically endangered plant species, that is threatened by habitat destruction in its native range.

Cultivation
Paulownia kawakamii is cultivated by plant nurseries, for use as an ornamental tree. In Southern California it is reported to be deep-rooted, and generally does not lift adjacent pavement.

References

Paulowniaceae
Flora of Taiwan
Flora of China
Flora of Japan
Critically endangered plants
Garden plants of Asia
Ornamental trees
Taxonomy articles created by Polbot